The Miner River is a river of the Tasman Region of New Zealand's South Island.

See also
List of rivers of New Zealand

References

Rivers of the Nelson Region
Rivers of the Tasman District
Rivers of New Zealand